The 2002 South Dakota gubernatorial election took place on November 2, 2002 to elect a Governor of South Dakota. Republican nominee Mike Rounds was elected, defeating Democratic nominee Jim Abbott.

Democratic primary

Candidates
Jim Abbott, President of the University of South Dakota, former South Dakota State Representative
Ron J. Volesky, South Dakota State Senator
Jim Hutmacher, South Dakota State Senator
Robert Hockett

Results

Republican primary

Candidates
Mike Rounds, former South Dakota State Senator
Mark Barnett, Attorney General of South Dakota
Steve T. Kirby, former Lieutenant Governor of South Dakota

Campaign
Rounds' victory was one of South Dakota's greatest political upsets. Until late in 2001, then-Congressman John Thune was the front-runner for the nomination. When Thune passed on the race in order to challenge Senator Tim Johnson, state Attorney General Mark Barnett and former Lieutenant Governor Steve T. Kirby quickly became candidates. Rounds declared his candidacy late, in December 2001 and was out-raised and outspent ten-to-one by each of his opponents.

However, the contest between Kirby and Barnett soon became very negative and "dirty". Barnett attacked Kirby for not investing in companies based in South Dakota and for his involvement with Collagenesis, a company which removed skin from donated human cadavers and processed them for use. It became the subject of a massive scandal when it was revealed that the company was using the skins for much more lucrative cosmetic surgery like lip and penis enhancements while burn victims "lie waiting in hospitals as nurses scour the country for skin to cover their wounds, even though skin is in plentiful supply for plastic surgeons". Kirby invested in the company after the scandal broke and Barnett attacked him for it in television advertisements. However, the advertisements backfired because "the claims were so outlandish, that people thought for sure that they were exaggerated or completely fabricated."

As the two front-runners concentrated on attacking each other, Rounds insisted on running a positive campaign and was not attacked by his opponents. Rounds' positive image and extensive knowledge of state government won him many supporters who were alienated by the front-runners. On the day of the primary election, Rounds won a stunning victory, with 44.3% of the vote to Barnett's 29.5% and Kirby's 26.1%.

Results

General election

Predictions

Results

References

2002
South Dakota
Gubernatorial